Eye was an unincorporated community located in Nicholas County, West Virginia, United States.

References 

Unincorporated communities in West Virginia
Unincorporated communities in Nicholas County, West Virginia